Richard Stanley Leigh Jones (born 16 February 1940) was a member of the New South Wales Legislative Council from 13 March 1988 to 28 February 2003.

Biography

Personal life and political career
Born in Epsom, Surrey, England, educated at Downsend School and Epsom College, he emigrated to Australia in 1965. He joined the Australia Party in 1971 and later the Australian Democrats, and was elected twice to the parliament as a Democrats candidate. He left the party in 1996 whilst still a sitting member and turned Independent, after endorsing Australian Labor Party candidates in the 1996 Federal election.

Green politics

He was the first convenor of Friends of the Earth Australia and assisted in the founding of Greenpeace in Australia. During his time in parliament, he voiced concern about environmental issues, including destruction of sand dunes at Myall Lakes.

Beyond his dedication to green politics and animal rights issues, he was also a vigorous proponent of alternative medicine; speaking several times in parliament in favour of homoeopathy and traditional Chinese medicine.

See also 
 Members of the New South Wales Legislative Council, 1999-2003

References 

1940 births
Living people
Australian Democrats politicians
Independent members of the Parliament of New South Wales
People educated at Epsom College
People educated at Downsend School
20th-century Australian politicians
21st-century Australian politicians
Members of the New South Wales Legislative Council